Poonam Chand Vishnoi (20 February 1924 - 25 May 2006) was a former speaker of Rajasthan Legislative Assembly from 7 July 1980 to 20 March 1985.  He is a senior leader of Indian National Congress Party in Rajasthan.  He hails from Jodhpur region of Rajasthan.  He was elected to Rajasthan Legislative Assembly from Bhinmal , Phalodi and Luni. He also served as deputy speaker of Rajasthan Legislative Assembly and Cabinet Minister in Rajasthan Government.

His daughter Vijay laxmi Bishnoi was Member of Rajasthan Legislative Assembly and Parliament Secretary between 1998 and 2003. She is Ex-Chief of Woman Wing of Indian National Congress and Several Boards in Rajasthan Government .

Poonam Chand Vishnoi had also contested 1999 Loksabha election  from Jodhpur (Lok Sabha constituency) as INC candidate and lost to Jaswant Singh Bishnoi by a small margin.

Early life
Poonam Chand Bishnoi Born in Feench village luni(tehsil) in District of Jodhpur, After doing LLB he was a practicing lawyer in Rajasthan High Court Jodhpur. In 1957, he successfully contested MLA election from Luni.

References

External link
 

Rajasthani politicians
Rajasthani people
Speakers of the Rajasthan Legislative Assembly
Deputy Speakers of the Rajasthan Legislative Assembly
Indian National Congress politicians
1924 births
2006 deaths
Indian National Congress politicians from Rajasthan